Justice Morgan (born 3 October 1991), is a Nigerian footballer who plays as a forward.

Club career
Morgan made his senior debut with Calcutta Football League side George Telegraph. In 2020, he moved to Aizawl in the I-League. On 7 February 2020, Morgan made his first assistance in the I-League, by providing Matías Verón in 76th minute of the rivalry against East Bengal.

References

External links
 

1991 births
Living people
Nigerian footballers
Association football forwards
Calcutta Football League players
George Telegraph S.C. players
I-League players
Aizawl FC players
Nigerian expatriate footballers
Nigerian expatriate sportspeople in India
Expatriate footballers in India